Phyllocnistis tropaeolicola is a moth of the family Gracillariidae. It is known only from Cerro de la Muerte, Villa Mills, at 3,100 m elevation in the Cordillera de Talamanca in Costa Rica.

The length of the forewings is 2.6-5.0 mm.

The larvae feed on Tropaeolum emarginatum.

References

Phyllocnistis
Endemic fauna of Costa Rica